Rick Leach and Jim Pugh were the defending champions, but did not participate together this year.  Leach partnered Kelly Jones, losing in the semifinals.  Pugh partnered Derrick Rostagno, losing in the second round.

Todd Woodbridge and Mark Woodforde won the title, defeating Jim Grabb and Richey Reneberg 6–4, 7–6 in the final.

Seeds
All seeds receive a bye into the second round.

Draw

Finals

Top half

Bottom half

References
Draw

U.S. Pro Indoor
1992 ATP Tour